Tanasee Bald, also called Tennessee Bald, is a mountain near the Blue Ridge Parkway in western North Carolina, on the Haywood/Transylvania border. It is 5561 feet high. It is in the Great Balsam Mountains within the Blue Ridge Mountains, which is part of the Appalachian Mountains

Tanasee Bald is the southern limit of breeding of the northern saw-whet owl, which is from the boreal forests of Canada.

Myth of Jutaculla

Cherokee folklore is that Jutaculla (alternative English spelling is Judaculla; Cherokee name is Tsul'kălû'), a slant-eyed giant, lives on top of the bald.

See also
List of mountains in North Carolina

References

Tanasee Bald
Landmarks in North Carolina
Protected areas of Haywood County, North Carolina
Protected areas of Transylvania County, North Carolina
Blue Ridge Parkway
Locations in Native American mythology
Mountains of Haywood County, North Carolina
Mountains of Transylvania County, North Carolina